Hladki or Hładki is a surname. Polish and Sorbian language feminine form: Hładka. Notable people with this surname include:

Jadwiga Hładki (1904–1944), Polish artist
Janice Hladki, Canadian artist
 (1896-1984), Polish diplomat

See also
 
 Hladký
 Gladki
Hladkyy

Slavic-language surnames